Sabium (also Sabum) was an Amorite King in the First Dynasty of Babylon, the Amorite Dynasty. He reigned c. 1781 BC – 1767 BC (short chronology), and ruled what was at the time a recently created, small and minor Amorite kingdom which included the town of Babylon. Sabium makes no claim of kingship of Babylon itself, suggesting that it had not yet grown into the major metropolis it would become under his descendant Hammurabi

See also

Babylonia

References

18th-century BC Babylonian kings
First dynasty of Babylon